Nikolay Ivelinov Bankov (born 19 November 1990) is a Bulgarian footballer who plays as a goalkeeper.

Career
Bankov started his career in his home town Dobrich in the local team Dobrudzha Dobrich. He made an impression during the 2016–17 season while playing for Lokomotiv Gorna Oryahovitsa. He left the club in June 2017 when his contract expired following the team's relegation to Second League.

On 18 July 2017, Bankov signed a 2-year contract with Polish I liga side Ruch Chorzów. He was part of the Arda Kardzhali team between June 2019 and June 2020.

References

External links
 

1990 births
Living people
Bulgarian footballers
First Professional Football League (Bulgaria) players
Second Professional Football League (Bulgaria) players
I liga players
Association football goalkeepers
PFC Spartak Varna players
PFC Minyor Pernik players
FC Haskovo players
OFC Pirin Blagoevgrad players
PFC Dobrudzha Dobrich players
FC Lokomotiv Gorna Oryahovitsa players
Ruch Chorzów players
FC Botev Vratsa players
FC Arda Kardzhali players
FC Septemvri Sofia players
Bulgarian expatriate footballers
Bulgarian expatriate sportspeople in Poland
Expatriate footballers in Poland
People from Dobrich